The Bohemian Fairy Swallow is a breed of fancy pigeon. Bohemian Fairy Swallows, along with other varieties of domesticated pigeons, are all descendants from the Rock Pigeon (Columba livia).

See also 
List of pigeon breeds

References 

Pigeon breeds